Leon Alaric Shafer (1866, Geneseo, Illinois–1940) was an American painter, etcher and illustrator.

Shafer was born in Illinois, but spent most of his life living in New Rochelle, New York.

He exhibited his work at the Art Institute of Chicago in 1897 and 1905.

Illustrations

Posters

References

1866 births
1940 deaths
People from Geneseo, Illinois
Painters from Illinois
Painters from New York (state)